Amurru was an Amorite kingdom established c. 2000 BC, in a region spanning present-day western and north-western Syria and northern Lebanon.

History
The inhabitants spoke the Amorite language, an extinct early Northwest Semitic language language classified as a westernmost or Amorite-specific dialect of Ugaritic. The kingdom and its people were synonymous with their god Amurru, also known as Martu, a storm and weather deity and tutelary deity of the unknown Mesopotamian city of Ninab, titled as bêl šadê and sometimes compared to the Canaanite and Mesopotamian god Hadad/Iškur.

The first documented leader of Amurru was Abdi-Ashirta (14th century BC), under whose leadership Amurru was part of the New Egyptian Empire. His son Aziru made contact with the Hittite king Šuppiluliuma I, and eventually defected to the Hittites.

The capital of the Amurru kingdom was the city of Sumur (located in the modern-day southern coast of Syria), a Phoenician city conquered by Abdi-Ashirta.

The Amurru kingdom was destroyed around 1200 B.C.

References

Citations

Sources

External links
 Chronology of Amurru

States and territories established in the 14th century BC
States and territories disestablished in the 12th century BC
Amarna letters locations
Ancient Lebanon
Former kingdoms